Ajitanath (lit. invincible) was the second tirthankara of the present age, avasarpini (half time cycle) according to Jainism. He was born to King Jitashatru and Queen Vijaya at Ayodhya in the Ikshvaku dynasty. He was a liberated soul which has destroyed all of its karma.

Life
Ajitnatha (lit. invincible) was the second tirthankara of the present age, avasarpini (half time cycle) according to Jainism.

Ajitnatha was born in the town of Saketa to King Jitashatru and Queen Vijaya at Ayodhya in the Ikshvaku dynasty on magha-shukla-dashmi (the tenth day of the bright half of the month of Magha). His height was 450 dhanusha. He lived for a span of 72 lakh purva.

He attained kevala jnana under the sal tree and Moksha on chaitra-shukla-panchmi (fifth day of the bright half of the month of Chaitra) from Shikharji.

Simhasena was his chief Ganadhara.

Literature
The Yajurveda mentions the name of Ajitanatha, but the meaning is not clear. According to Jain traditions, his younger brother was Sagara. Sagara, who became the second Chakravartin, is known from the traditions of both Hindu and Jain scriptures.

Adoration
Ajinatha is associated with his Elephant emblem, Saptha-parna tree, Mahayaksha Yaksha and Yogini & Ajithabala Yakshis.

Literature
 The Ajitha purana, by Ranna narrates the story of Ajitanatha.
 Ajitasanti compiled by Nandisena in 7th century is a praise to Ajitnatha and Shantinatha.

Famous temples
 Taranga Jain Temple, Vasai Jain Temple in Bhadresar, Bandhaji
 Chaturmukha Basadi, Gerusoppa

See also

 Arihant (Jainism)
 Ikshvaku dynasty
 Ajitha purana

References

Citations

Sources

Further reading
 
 

Tirthankaras
Solar dynasty
People from Faizabad
Ancient Indian people